Nam-ı Kemal jokes are a variety of dirty jokes in Turkish folk literature that originated during the Ottoman era. The phrase "nam-ı Kemal" corresponds in the archaic Ottoman Turkish language to the phrase "[a man] named Kemal", i.e. a generic and unconventionally humorous everyman. However, due to their name's vocal similarity with the name of one of the most foremost figures in Turkish literature, the poet and playwright Namık Kemal (1840–1888), the jokes underwent an evolution. With the growing obscurity of Ottoman terms among most speakers of modern Turkish, "nam-ı Kemal jokes" became, more often than not, "Namık Kemal jokes", an example of a mondegreen.

The obscenity of the "nam-ı Kemal jokes" tradition is based mainly on phallic exaggerations.

References 

Off-color humor
Turkish culture